The 1876–77 United States House of Representatives elections were held on various dates in various states between June 5, 1876 and March 13, 1877. Each state set its own date for its elections to the House of Representatives before the first session of the 45th United States Congress convened on October 15, 1877. The size of the House increased to 293 seats with the addition of the new state of Colorado.

These elections coincided with the (heavily contested) election of President Rutherford B. Hayes and the United States Centennial. Hayes' Republican Party was able to recover from the Democratic Party many of the seats it had lost two years before as the economy improved slightly. However, the Democrats retained a majority and were able to use the disinterest of the people in Republican Reconstruction-led projects to help keep crucial seats. Republican congressional leadership had a difficult time distancing itself from the corruption of the Grant administration or the legislature's impact on the economy downturn.

Election summaries

The previous election included 4 Independents, in Illinois and Massachusetts.

Election dates 

In 1845, Congress passed a law providing for a uniform nationwide date for choosing Presidential electors. This law did not affect election dates for Congress, which remained within the jurisdiction of State governments, but over time, the states moved their congressional elections to this date as well. In 1876–77, there were still 8 states with earlier election dates, and 1 state with a later election date.

Elections before Election Day (United States):
 June 5: Oregon
 September 5: Vermont
 September 11: Maine
 October 4:Georgia
 October 10: Indiana, Iowa, Ohio, West Virginia

Standard Election Day:
 November 7, 1876

Election after Election Day:
 March 13, 1877: New Hampshire

Special elections

Alabama 

Alabama redistricted and eliminated its at-large seats, going from 6 districts and 2 at-large seats to 8 districts.  The state also elected a full delegation of Democrats, voting out the two Republicans.

|-
! 
| Charles Hays
|  | Republican
| 1872
|  | Incumbent retired.New member elected.Democratic gain.
| nowrap | 

|-
! 
| colspan=3 | New district
|  | New seat.New member elected.Democratic gain.
| nowrap | 

|-
! 
| Jeremiah Norman Williams
|  | Democratic
| 1874
| Incumbent re-elected.
| nowrap | 

|-
! 
| Jeremiah Haralson
|  | Republican
| 1874
|  | Incumbent lost re-election.New member elected.Democratic gain.
| nowrap | 

|-
! 
| colspan=3 | New district
|  | New seat.New member elected.Democratic gain.
| nowrap | 

|-
! rowspan=2 | 
| Goldsmith W. Hewitt
|  | Democratic
| 1874
| Incumbent re-elected.
| rowspan=2 nowrap | 

|-
| Burwell Boykin Lewis
|  | Democratic
| 1874
|  | Incumbent lost renomination.Democratic loss.

|-
! rowspan=3 | 
| William Henry Forney
|  | Democratic
| 1874
| Incumbent re-elected.
| rowspan=3 nowrap | 

|-
| Taul Bradford
|  | Democratic
| 1874
|  | Incumbent retired.Democratic loss.

|-
| John H. Caldwell
|  | Democratic
| 1872
|  | Incumbent retired.Democratic loss.

|-
! 
| colspan=3 | New district
|  | New seat.New member elected.Democratic gain.
| nowrap | 

|}

Arkansas 

|-
! 
| Lucien C. Gause
|  | Democratic
| 1874
| Incumbent re-elected.
| nowrap | 

|-
! 
| William F. Slemons
|  | Democratic
| 1874
| Incumbent re-elected.
| nowrap | 

|-
! 
| William W. Wilshire
|  | Democratic
| 18721874 1874
|  | Incumbent retired.New member elected.Democratic hold.
| nowrap | 

|-
! 
| Thomas M. Gunter
|  | Democratic
| 1872
| Incumbent re-elected.
| nowrap | 

|}

California 

|-
! 
| William Adam Piper
|  | Democratic
| 1875
|  | Incumbent lost re-election.New member elected.Republican gain.
| nowrap | 

|-
! 
| Horace F. Page
|  | Republican
| 1872
| Incumbent re-elected.
| nowrap | 

|-
! 
| John K. Luttrell
|  | Democratic
| 1872
| Incumbent re-elected.
| nowrap | 

|-
! 
| Peter D. Wigginton
|  | Democratic
| 1875
|  | Incumbent lost re-election.New member elected.Republican gain.
| nowrap | 

|}

Colorado 

There were two elections to the new state of Colorado.

44th Congress 

|-
! 
| colspan=3 | New district
|  | New seat.New member elected.Republican gain.
| nowrap | 

|}

45th Congress 

|-
! 
| James B. Belford
|  | Republican 
| 1876
| Incumbent re-elected.Election was later successfully challenged by the challenger.
| nowrap | 

|}

Connecticut 

Connecticut had been electing is members late in the cycle, even after the terms had begun.  But starting in 1876, the state joined the others in electing its members on the November 7, 1876 Election Day. The delegation remained 3 Democrats and 1 Republican.

|-
! 
| George M. Landers
|  | Democratic
| 1875
| Incumbent re-elected.
| nowrap | 

|-
! 
| James Phelps
|  | Democratic
| 1875
| Incumbent re-elected.
| nowrap | 

|-
! 
| John T. Wait
|  | Republican
| 1876 
| Incumbent re-elected.
| nowrap | 

|-
! 
| William Henry Barnum
|  | Democratic
| 1867
|  | Incumbent resigned May 18, 1876, when elected U.S. senator.New member elected.Democratic hold.Winner also elected to finish the current next term.
| nowrap | 

|}

Delaware 

|-
! 
| James Williams
|  | Democratic
| 1874
| Incumbent re-elected.
| nowrap | 

|}

Florida 

|-
! 
| William J. Purman
|  | Republican
| 1872
|  | Incumbent lost re-election.New member elected.Democratic gain.
| nowrap | 

|-
! 
| Jesse J. Finley
|  | Democratic
| 1874
|  | Incumbent lost re-election.New member elected.Republican gain.
| nowrap | 

|}

Georgia

Illinois

Indiana

Iowa

Kansas

Kentucky

Louisiana

Maine

Maryland

Massachusetts 

|-
! 
| William W. Crapo
|  | Republican
| 1875 (special)
| Incumbent re-elected.
| nowrap | 

|-
! 
| Benjamin W. Harris
|  | Republican
| 1872
| Incumbent re-elected.
| nowrap | 

|-
! 
| Henry L. Pierce
|  | Republican
| 1874
|  |Incumbent retired.New member elected after initial result overturned.Democratic gain.
| nowrap | 

|-
! 
| Josiah Gardner Abbott
|  | Democratic
| 1874
|  |Incumbent retired.New member elected.Democratic hold.
| nowrap | 

|-
! 
| Nathaniel P. Banks
|  | Republican
| 1874
| Incumbent re-elected.
| nowrap | 

|-
! 
| Charles Perkins Thompson
|  | Democratic
| 1874
|  |Incumbent lost re-election.New member elected.Republican gain.
| nowrap | 

|-
! 
| John K. Tarbox
|  | Democratic
| 1874
|  | Incumbent lost re-election.New member elected.Republican gain.
| nowrap | 
|-
! 
| John M. S. Williams
|  | Democratic
| 1874
|  | Incumbent lost re-election.New member elected.Republican gain.
| nowrap | 

|-
! 
| George F. Hoar
|  | Republican
| 1868
|  | Incumbent retired to run for U.S. Senate.New member elected.Republican hold.
| nowrap | 

|-
! 
| Charles A. Stevens
|  | Republican
| 1875 (special)
|  |Incumbent retired.New member elected.Republican hold.
| nowrap | 

|-
! 
| Chester W. Chapin
|  | Democratic
| 1874
|  |Incumbent lost re-election.New member elected.Republican gain.
| nowrap | 
|}

Michigan

Minnesota

Mississippi 

|-
! 
| Lucius Q. C. Lamar
|  | Democratic
| 1872
|  | Incumbent retired to run for U.S. senator.New member elected.Democratic hold.
| nowrap | 

|-
! 
| G. Wiley Wells
|  | Republican
| 1874
|  | Incumbent retired.New member elected.Democratic gain.
| nowrap | 

|-
! 
| Hernando Money
|  | Democratic
| 1874
| Incumbent re-elected.
| nowrap | 

|-
! 
| Otho R. Singleton
|  | Democratic
| 1874
| Incumbent re-elected.
| nowrap | 

|-
! 
| Charles E. Hooker
|  | Democratic
| 1874
| Incumbent re-elected.
| nowrap | 

|-
! 
| John R. Lynch
|  | Republican
| 1872
|  | Incumbent lost re-election.New member elected.Democratic gain.
| nowrap | 

|}

Missouri

Nebraska 

|-
! 
| Lorenzo Crounse
|  | Republican 
| 1872
|  | Incumbent retired.New member elected.Republican hold.
| nowrap | 

|}

Nevada

New Hampshire

New Jersey

New York

North Carolina

Ohio

Oregon

Pennsylvania

Rhode Island

South Carolina 

|-
! 
| Joseph Rainey
|  | Republican
| 1870 
| Incumbent re-elected.
| nowrap | 

|-
! 
| Edmund W. M. Mackey
|  | Independent Republican
| 1874
|  | Seat declared vacant July 19, 1876, due to contested election.New member elected.Republican gain.
| nowrap | 

|-
! 
| Solomon L. Hoge
|  | Republican
| 1874
|  | Incumbent retired.New member elected.Democratic gain.
| nowrap | 

|-
! 
| Alexander S. Wallace
|  | Republican
| 1868
|  | Incumbent lost re-election.New member elected.Democratic gain.
| nowrap | 

|-
! 
| Robert Smalls
|  | Republican
| 1874
| Incumbent re-elected.
| nowrap | 

|}

Tennessee 

|-
! 
| William McFarland
|  | Democratic 
| 1874
|  |Incumbent lost re-election.New member elected.Republican gain.
| nowrap | 

|-
! 
| Jacob M. Thornburgh
|  | Republican
| 1872
| Incumbent re-elected.
| nowrap | 

|-
! 
| George G. Dibrell
|  | Democratic
| 1874
| Incumbent re-elected.
| nowrap | 

|-
! 
| Haywood Y. Riddle
|  | Democratic
| 1875 (special)
| Incumbent re-elected.
|  nowrap | 

|-
! 
| John M. Bright
|  | Democratic
| 1870
| Incumbent re-elected.
| nowrap | 

|-
! 
| John F. House
|  | Democratic
| 1874
| Incumbent re-elected.
| nowrap | 

|-
! 
| Washington C. Whitthorne
|  | Democratic
| 1870
| Incumbent re-elected.
| nowrap | 

|-
! 
| John D. C. Atkins
|  | Democratic
| 1872
| Incumbent re-elected.
| nowrap | 

|-
! 
| William P. Caldwell
|  | Democratic
| 1874
| Incumbent re-elected.
| nowrap | 

|}

Texas

Vermont

Virginia

West Virginia 

|-
! 
| Benjamin Wilson
|  | Democratic
| 1874
| Incumbent re-elected.
| nowrap | 

|-
! 
| Charles J. Faulkner
|  | Democratic
| 1874
|  | Incumbent retired to run for U.S. senator.New member elected.Democratic hold.
| nowrap | 

|-
! 
| Frank Hereford
|  | Democratic
| 1870
|  | Incumbent retired to run for U.S. senator.New member elected.Democratic hold.
| nowrap | 

|}

Wisconsin

Wisconsin elected eight members of congress on Election Day, November 7, 1876.

|-
! 
| Charles G. Williams
|  | Republican
| 1872
| Incumbent re-elected.
| nowrap | 

|-
! 
| Lucien B. Caswell
|  | Republican
| 1874
| Incumbent re-elected.
| nowrap | 

|-
! 
| Henry S. Magoon
|  | Republican
| 1870
|  | Incumbent lost renomination.New member elected.Republican hold.
| nowrap | 

|-
! 
| William Pitt Lynde
|  | Democratic
| 1874
| Incumbent re-elected.
| nowrap | 

|-
! 
| Samuel D. Burchard
|  | Democratic
| 1874
|  | Incumbent lost renomination.New member elected.Democratic hold.
| nowrap | 

|-
! 
| Alanson M. Kimball
|  | Republican
| 1874
| |  Incumbent lost re-election.New member elected.Democratic gain.
| nowrap | 

|-
! 
| Jeremiah McLain Rusk
|  | Republican
| 1870
|  | Incumbent lost renomination.New member elected.Republican hold.
| nowrap | 

|-
! 
| George W. Cate
|  | Democratic
| 1874
| |  Incumbent lost re-election.New member elected.Republican gain.
| nowrap | 

|}

Non-voting delegates

|-
! 

|-
! 
| Jefferson P. Kidder
|  | Republican
| 1874
| Incumbent re-elected.
| nowrap | 

|-
! 
| Stephen S. Fenn
|  | Democratic
| 1874
| Incumbent re-elected.
| nowrap | 

|-
! 
| Martin Maginnis
|  | Democratic
| 1872
| Incumbent re-elected.
| nowrap | 

|-
! 

|-
! 

|-
! 
| William R. Steele
|  | Democratic
| 1872
|  | Incumbent lost re-election.New member elected.Republican gain.
| nowrap | 

|}

See also
 1876 United States elections
 1876 United States presidential election
 1876–77 United States Senate elections
 44th United States Congress
 45th United States Congress

Notes

References

Bibliography

External links
 Office of the Historian (Office of Art & Archives, Office of the Clerk, U.S. House of Representatives)